Eishalle Herti was an indoor sporting arena located in Zug, Switzerland.  The capacity of the arena was 6,780 and has been built in 1967. It was the home arena of the EV Zug ice hockey team.
In Mai 2010 it was demolished and replaced by the newly built Bossard Arena.

Indoor ice hockey venues in Switzerland
Zug
Buildings and structures in the canton of Zug